Marian Moszoro Մարիան Մոշորո (born September 14, 1974 in Rosario, Argentina) is a Polish economist. In 2005-2006 he was Undersecretary of State, Deputy Minister of Finance of Poland, the youngest ever in the history of the Ministry.

Biography
Marian Moszoro was born in Rosario, Argentina. He graduated from SGH – Warsaw School of Economics (PhD in Financial Economics, 2004) and the Haas School of Business, University of California, Berkeley (Post-doc, 2009-2011, under Nobel laureate economist Oliver E. Williamson). He held academic positions at the Haas School of Business, University of California, Berkeley, Harvard Law School, and Université Paris-Dauphine. Currently (2017), Dr. Moszoro is a professor at George Mason University’s Department of Economics and the Interdisciplinary Center for Economic Science, and a faculty affiliate at Cornell University's Program in Infrastructure Policy. 
Dr. Moszoro served as consultant to the World Bank, UNIDO, and several companies.

Research issues

Dr. Moszoro’s dissertation on Public-Private Partnerships was published as a monograph with two editions. He has authored several books, scientific articles, and case studies. His areas of research are: law & economics and positive political economy, corporate and project finance, and public-private partnerships.

He plays rugby.

References

External links
 Marian Moszoro's webpage (English)
 Marian Moszoro's publications (English)
 Marian Moszoro's publications (Polish)
 Marian Moszoro’s articles
 Marian Moszoro’s case studies

1974 births
Polish economists
Polish politicians
Living people
University of California, Berkeley faculty